Paintings of Abanindranath Tagore is a book on Abanindranath Tagore's paintings by art historian R. Siva Kumar. It is widely considered as a landmark book in the Indian art scene that brings together a large corpus of Abanindranath's work for the first time. It fulfils a glaring lacuna in the picture of this master of modern Indian art.

In the books R. Siva Kumar states, 'The social space that Abanindranath narrativized as an artist-flaneur is thus the subject of the Orientalist artist/writer read from the obverse. He reclaims the colonial subjects' right to narrate their stories that was arrogated to themselves by the colonial rulers and perpetuated by presenting their readings as 'objective'. Abanindranath reasserts this right by recasting the Nights (Arabian Nights), a text central to the Orientalist representation of the East, by urging us to read his act of imagination contrapuntally with the text authenticated by the Orientalist.'

Abanindranath Tagore (1871–1951) is a singular figure in Modern Indian Art. Having arrived on the Indian art scene with the first wave of nationalism, he was seen as father figure of nationalist art and modernism. Along with E. B. Havell, Coomaraswamy, Sister Nivedita and other nationalists he brought an attitudinal change in the Indian response to traditional art. But his true contribution went beyond these. Trained under European artists initially, realism remained the underpinning of his work. But as a modernist at heart who was guided more by his sensibility than his training, he transformed the post Renaissance academic realism into which he was trained with his series of contacts with oriental art into something more supple and responsive to the imaginative flights of his mind. A post-Romantic in his sensibilities, he let his individualism triumph over his nationalism. Although he aligned with the nationalists in the early years of his career he transcended it very soon to develop something more akin to a Baudelairian aesthetics of modernism with a subjective response to the world rather than an unmediated representation of things. His most impressive work, the Arabian Nights series painted in 1930, can be described as a look at his immediate world through the eyes of a Baudelarian Flaneur, with the stories of the Arabian Nights serving as a pre-text. Equally original as a writer, Abanindranath is a phenomenon whose import has not been fully grasped. Much of this has been due to the unfamiliarity with his work in the absence of easily accessible public collections and publications. The present book brings together a large body of his work for the first time in an attempt to fulfill a glaring lacuna in our picture of this early master of modern Indian art.

The book has also influenced other books and researches on Abanindranath Tagore. Ananya Vajpeyi in her Righteous Republic: The Political Foundations of Modern India highlights the contribution of R. Siva Kumar's Paintings of Abanindranath Tagore in foregrounding Abanindranath Tagore's  art anew.

See also
 R. Siva Kumar
 Santiniketan: The Making of a Contextual Modernism
 Abanindranath Tagore
 Rabindra Chitravali
 The Last Harvest : Paintings of Rabindranath Tagore (Book)

References

Art history books
Books by R. Siva Kumar
Case studies
Works about art genres
Works about ideologies
2008 non-fiction books
Memorials to Rabindranath Tagore